Brhovo (sometimes Vrhovo or in older sources Verhovo) is a former village in eastern Slovenia in the Municipality of Trebnje. It is now part of the village of Mala Ševnica. It is part of the traditional region of Lower Carniola and is now included in the Southeast Slovenia Statistical Region.

Geography
Brhovo lies northeast of the village center of Mala Ševnica. Žug Hill rises to the west, and Trnič Hill to the north. The Cejniče Woods lie north of Brhovo, where there is a powerful spring known as Na studencu (literally, 'at the spring').

Name
The toponym Brhovo, like the variant Vrhovo, is found only in Lower Carniola. The pronunciation with an initial B- (also found in the local pronunciation of Vrhovo in the Municipality of Radeče and for Vrhovo pri Šentlovrencu) and medieval transcriptions indicate that the name is not derived from the common noun vrh 'summit, peak'. Instead, it is believed to have resulted from ellipsis of a name like *Bryxovo selo (literally, 'Bryxъ's village') or *Bryxovo poľe (literally, 'Bryxъ's field'), referring to an early resident of the place.

History
Brhovo  was annexed by Mala Ševnica in 1953, ending its existence as a separate settlement.

References

External links
 Brhovo on Geopedia

Populated places in the Municipality of Trebnje
Former settlements in Slovenia